Scandals, or sometimes Scandals PDX, is a gay bar in Portland, Oregon, in the United States.

Description and history
Scandals was established in 1979. In 2015, Willamette Week said of the bar: 

In his 2019 "overview of Portland's LGBTQ+ nightlife for the newcomer", Andrew Jankowski of the Portland Mercury wrote: "At 40 years young, Scandals is among Portland's longest-running LGBTQ+ bars and is the last vestige of downtown's long-gone Vaseline Alley gay district. Scandals features pool tables, a sidewalk patio, trivia, viewing parties, karaoke, and monthly live jazz. You can order food from neighboring dive restaurant the Roxy and bring it over. Every June during Pride, Scandals shuts down their section of street for an epic block party."

Scandals was a runner-up in the "Best LGBTQ Bar" category of Willamette Week "Best of Portland Readers' Poll 2020".

References

External links

 
 

1979 establishments in Oregon
LGBT culture in Portland, Oregon
LGBT drinking establishments in Oregon
Southwest Portland, Oregon